Isaac Nuhu (born 30 September 2001) is an Ghanaian professional footballer who plays as a midfielder for Belgian First Division A side Eupen.

Club career
Nuhu began his career at the Aspire Academy in Senegal before joining with Belgian side Eupen in January 2020. He made his professional debut for the club on 10 August 2020 against Oud-Heverlee Leuven and scored his first professional goal in that match as well. His 72nd-minute goal was the equalizer in a 1–1 draw.

Career statistics

Club

References

2001 births
Living people
Ghanaian footballers
Association football midfielders
K.A.S. Eupen players
Belgian Pro League players
Ghanaian expatriate footballers
Expatriate footballers in Belgium